Xia Leon Sloane (formerly Alexia Sloane) is a British composer of contemporary classical music and a poet. They were the winner of the 2016 Cambridge Young Composer of the Year competition and also one of seven winners of the Classic FM/Royal Philharmonic Society 25th Birthday Commissions in 2017. In 2018 they won the senior category of the BBC Proms Inspire Young Composers' competition.

Composer 

Sloane began composing music through improvisation at the age of six and started taking formal lessons when they were twelve. Common themes that run through their compositions are those of nature (particularly climate change), philosophy and psychology, taking much inspiration from Buddhist, environmental and synaesthetic imagery. As well as vocal music, they enjoy writing for unusual combinations of instruments and the setting of texts from languages and cultures such as Basque and Mandarin. Sloane sees the arts as a means through which people can reconnect and this is the focus of much of their work. The use and effect of silence in music fascinate them, as does the use of music as a form of deep self-expression.

Their compositional method is to strongly imagine the pitches they wish to be played or sung, away from any instrument. They then write the pitches down in Braille music notation before dictating them to an amanuensis who transcribes them onto notation software.

Sloane was an Aldeburgh Young Musician from 2015-2016 and studied Composition at the Royal College of Music Junior Department in London from 2016-2018. During that time they were also a composer with the National Youth Orchestra of Great Britain and the Britten Sinfonia Academy. In 2018, they began studying Composition at the Royal Northern College of Music, Manchester, where they hold a scholarship, under the tutelage of Professor Emily Howard.

In 2016, Sloane was the first female composer to win The Cambridge Young Composer of the Year Competition with the piece Passiflora. In 2017 they were one of seven winners of the Classic FM/Royal Philharmonic Society 25th Birthday Commissions and also won the Royal College of Music Junior Department Joan Weller Composition Prize. The following year they were awarded the Humphrey Searle Composition Prize, again by the RCM Junior Department.

Their choral piece Longing for Equinox was highly commended in the 2017 BBC Proms Inspire Young Composers' Competition and they won the senior category of that same competition in 2018 with their piece Elegy for Aylan. As a result, the piece was performed by the Aurora Orchestra in August 2018 as part of the BBC Proms series. In July 2019 Sloane made their official Proms debut with their BBC commissioned piece, Earthward, which was performed by VOCES8 at Cadogan Hall. Sloane is also now an ambassador for the BBC Proms Inspire Competition.

Performers 
The following ensembles, groups and choirs have performed Sloane's compositions:

 Aldeburgh Young Musicians
 Block4 Recorders
 Dr K Sextet
 Ensemble 10/10
 Huw Watkins
 Members of the National Youth Orchestra of Great Britain
 Members of the Royal Liverpool Philharmonic Orchestra
 Oliver Coates
 The Aurora Orchestra
 The Brodsky String quartet
 The Children's choir of Kings Junior Voices (Cambridge, England)
 The Choir of the Ladies Presbyterian College (Melbourne, Australia)
 The Girls' Choir of St Catharine's College, Cambridge
 The Hermes Experiment
 The Ligeti Quartet
 The Phaedra Ensemble
 The Senior musicians of the Royal College of Music
 VOCES8

Venues 
Sloane's compositions have been performed at the following venues:
 The BBC Radio Theatre (London, England)
 The Bridgewater Hall (Manchester, England)
 Cadogan Hall (London, England)
 Cafe Oto (London, England)
 The Cambridge Guildhall (Cambridge, England)
 Emmanuel College (Cambridge, England)
 The Fitzwilliam Museum (Cambridge, England)
 Great St Mary's University Church (Cambridge, England)
 Handel House (London, England)
 King's College Chapel (Cambridge, England)
 The Royal College of Music (London, England)
 The Royal Northern College of Music (Manchester, England)
 Snape Maltings Concert Hall (Suffolk, England)
 Southbank Centre (London, England)
 St Catharine's College Chapel (Cambridge, England)
 St George's Hall (Liverpool, England)
 Tate Modern (London, England)
 West Road Concert Hall (Cambridge, England)

Poet 

Sloane began writing poetry at an early age. In 2014 they were the 14 and under Category Winner of The Stephen Spender Prize for Poetry in Translation and, aged sixteen, self-published Hushed Skies, an Anthology of their own verse. Sloane often uses their own poems as a source of inspiration to inspire some of their compositions.

Personal life 

Sloane announced in August 2020 via their Twitter account that they had changed their name to Xia Leon Sloane.

References 

2000 births
Living people
British composers